Ijebu North East is a Local Government Area in Ogun State, Nigeria.

The postal code of the area is 120.

References

Local Government Areas in Ogun State